The King Iron Bridge & Manufacturing Company was a late-19th-century bridge building company located in Cleveland, Ohio. It was founded by Zenas King (1818–1892) in 1858 and subsequently managed by his sons, James A. King and Harry W. King and then his grandson, Norman C. King, until the mid-1920s.  Many of the bridges built by the company were used during America's expansion west in the late 19th century and early 20th century, and some of these bridges are still standing today.

Remaining examples

Pyeatt's Mill Bridge AKA "Boner Bridge" (1869, Restored 2010), Little Pigeon River in Warrick County, Indiana
Crum Road Bridge (1875), Walkersville, Maryland
Skunk River Bridge (1876), Story County, Iowa. Originally located over the Skunk River in Cambridge, Iowa, moved southeast of Ames, Iowa in 1916. Vacated in 1990, and NRHP-listed in 1998.
Marmaton Bridge (1878), Fort Scott, Kansas, 1 mile NE of Fort Scott, NRHP-listed
Bowstring Truss Bridge (1878), near Ironto, Virginia
Half Chance Iron Bridge (1880), Marengo County, Alabama
Sparkill Creek Drawbridge (1880), Piermont, New York
Adel Bridge (1882), Adel, Iowa. NRHP-listed in 2002
Beech Fork Bridge, Mackville Road (1884), near Springfield, Kentucky, NRHP-listed
Cartwright Creek Bridge (1884), also near Springfield, Kentucky, NRHP-listed
Old Alton Bridge (1884), Denton County, Texas
Quarry Bridge (1885), County Road I-4 over the Iowa River, Quarry, Iowa. NRHP-listed
Second Street Bridge (1886), Allegan, Michigan, NRHP-listed
Monsrud Bridge (1887), Waterville, Iowa relocated to Yellow River State Forest in 2004, NRHP-listed
Merriam Street Bridge (1887), Minneapolis, Minnesota (originally built in 1887 as the Broadway Avenue Bridge, one span relocated to Nicollet Island in 1987)
Swing Bridge at New Bridge Landing (1888), Main St. and Old New Bridge Rd. over Hackensack River, in Teaneck and River Edge, New Jersey NRHP-listed
 Old Richardsville Road Bridge (1889) Bowling Green, Kentucky over Barren River. Bridge is NRHP-listed.
Bennies Hill Road Bridge (1889), Frederick County, Maryland
South Dakota Department of Transportation Bridge No. 14-088-170 (1890), Vermillion, South Dakota, local road over Clay Creek Ditch, NRHP-listed
Clear Creek Bridge (1891), Twp. Rd. over Clear Cr., 5.8 mi. NW of Bellwood, Bellwood, Nebraska NRHP-listed
Waverly Street Bridge (1892), Waverly St. at Georges Creek, Westernport, Maryland. NRHP-listed
Hogback Bridge (1893), Curwensville, Pennsylvania
Singing Bridge (1894), Frankfort, Kentucky, also known as St. Clair Street Bridge
Ellsworth Ranch Bridge (1895), 130th St., over E fork of Des Moines R., Armstrong, Iowa NRHP-listed
Rosendale trestle (1895–96), Rosendale, New York
Dearborn River High Bridge (1897), 15 mi. SW of Augusta on Bean Lake Rd., Augusta, Montana NRHP-listed
Manhasset Viaduct (1898), carries the Port Washington Branch of the Long Island Rail Road over Manhasset Bay between the Village of Thomaston and the Hamlet of Manhasset.
Niantic River Bridge (1907), New London County, Connecticut (1907, being replaced in 2010-2012), deemed NRHP-eligible in 1987 but not finally NRHP-listed due to owner objection
Robidoux Creek Pratt Truss Bridge (1910), Frankfort, Kansas, on Sunflower Road over Robidoux Creek, NRHP-listed
Detroit-Superior Bridge (1918), Cleveland, Ohio

Additional bridges designed and/or built by the company (and many likely to be surviving) are:

Abandoned Illinois Railway (IR) Through truss bridge over Rock River, Rockford, Illinois. Built 1890s, relocated to present location 1929. Repurposed as a rail trail bridge in 2016.

Demolished bridges
KY 2541 Bridge (1884), Greenup, Kentucky over Little Sandy River, NRHP-listed, demolished 2012 and replaced
Bridge over North Fork of Roanoke River (1892), near Ironto, Virginia, demolished 1995-1996
Williams Street Bridge (1894), Helena, Montana, Williams St. crossing Ten Mile Creek, N of jct. of Williams St. and Broadwater Ave.,  NRHP-listed. Replaced by new bridge in 2010.
South Dakota Dept. of Transportation Bridge No. 29-221-060 (1894), Castlewood, South Dakota, local road over the Big Sioux River, NRHP-listed, demolished and replaced 1999

References

External links

King Bridge Museum
King Iron Bridge & Manufacturing Company at the Cleveland Digital Library

 
American companies established in 1858
Companies based in Cleveland
Construction and civil engineering companies of the United States
Defunct companies based in Ohio
1858 establishments in Ohio
Construction and civil engineering companies established in 1858